WEGW (107.5 MHz "Eagle 107.5") is a commercial FM radio station licensed to Wheeling, West Virginia, and serving the West Virginia Panhandle and parts of Ohio and Pennsylvania. It has a mainstream rock radio format and is owned and operated by iHeartMedia, Inc. On weekday mornings it carries the nationally syndicated John Boy and Billy Show. The rest of the schedule is voicetracked from Maria Malito and Ken Dashow of co-owned WAXQ New York City and Ron "Big Rig" Michaels from WXTB Tampa. On weekends, WEGW formerly carried auto races from the Motor Racing Network and the Performance Racing Network.

WEGW has an effective radiated power (ERP) of 16,000 watts. The transmitter is on Kirkwood Heights Road in Bridgeport, Ohio.

History
The original call sign was WTRF-FM. It was a network affiliate of the Mutual Broadcasting System and played a variety of musical styles in its early days.

In 1984, it changed its call letters to WZMM and in 1989, it switched to its current call sign, WEGW.

References

External links
 
 

EGW
Mainstream rock radio stations in the United States
IHeartMedia radio stations